Gerald "Gerry" Armstrong is a former member of the Church of Scientology. In 1980, the Church assigned Armstrong, then a member of the Church's elite Sea Org, to organize some personal papers of L. Ron Hubbard that were to serve as the basis of a new biography of Hubbard. A non-Scientologist, Omar Garrison, had been hired to write the book. As part of his assignment, Armstrong also requested Hubbard's war records from the Navy and his transcripts from George Washington University.

Lawsuit 
Armstrong's transfer of the Hubbard-related documents to his attorney prompted a lawsuit, Church of Scientology of California vs. Gerald Armstrong. The decision in the case, by Judge Paul Breckenridge, found that Armstrong's fears of persecution by the Church were reasonable, and thus his conduct in turning over the documents in his possession to his attorney was also reasonable:

This 1984 judgment that Armstrong's transfer of documents of the Church of Scientology International (CSI) to his attorney was justified was affirmed seven years later in Church of Scientology v. Gerald Armstrong.

In December 1986, the parties entered into a settlement agreement under which CSI paid Armstrong $800,000 in exchange for his dismissal of claims against CSI. Armstrong agreed to not publish orally or in writing any information about his experience with CSI, and that he would be liable for $50,000 for each breach of confidentiality. On October 17, 1995, a California court concluded that Armstrong had breached the agreement and awarded CSI $321,932 in damages and $334,671.75 in court costs. The court also enjoined Armstrong from assisting others with lawsuits against CSI.

Armstrong apparently continued to assist people with lawsuits against CSI and posting information about CSI on the Internet because on three occasions – June 1997; February 1998; and December 2000 – courts found Armstrong in contempt of its previous order and in violation of his settlement agreement. These violations resulted in $3,600 in fines and an order that he be confined in jail for 26 days. However, Armstrong claimed to be living in British Columbia, Canada, never showed up for court, and was never confined.

On April 2, 2002, CSI sued Armstrong for $10,050,000 for breaches of his settlement agreement. Armstrong admitted that he had breached the agreement more than 200 times, but claimed that parts of the agreement were illegal, unconstitutional and unenforceable. At trial on April 9, 2004, the court found that 131 breaches of the agreement did occur, but found that it would be unconscionable to "punish" Armstrong with liquidated damages in excess of the $800,000 he received as a benefit under the settlement agreement. Noting that Armstrong had previously been "sanctioned" in the sum of $300,000, the court entered judgment for CSI in the amount of $500,000.

See also
Scientology controversies

References

Further reading

Scientology’s Crumbling: Can Gerry Armstrong Begin to Think of Crossing the Border?—Accessed 03/Aug/2013

External links

 Gerry Armstrong's web site, including archives related to his ongoing legal conflicts with the Church of Scientology
 Memorandum of Intended Decision in Church of Scientology of California vs. Gerald Armstrong (PDF format) (Transcription)

Living people
American activists
American expatriates in Canada
American former Scientologists
1946 births